Nicolò Bonito (died 1740 in Naples) was an Italian painter, depicting mainly landscapes.

Biography
Bonito left Naples as a young man for Livorno where he met the landscape artist, Gioachinno Beich (Franz Joachim Beich). When Beich left for Germany, Bonito moved to Rome under Orizzonte (Jan Frans van Bloemen). In Naples, Bonito's disciple was Gabriello Ricciardelli (Gabrielle Ricciardelli), son of the painter Giuseppe.

References

1740 deaths
18th-century Italian painters
Italian male painters
Italian landscape painters
Painters from Naples
18th-century Italian male artists